Austin Briggs (September 8, 1908 – October 10, 1973) was a cartoonist and illustrator. Born in Humboldt, Minnesota he grew up in Detroit, Michigan before moving to New York City as a teenager. After working for a while at an advertising agency, he began providing illustrations for the "upmarket" pulp magazine Blue Book. Briggs later became an assistant to the cartoonist Alex Raymond on Flash Gordon and succeeded him on Secret Agent Corrigan. In 1940, he drew a Flash Gordon daily strip which he stayed on until about 1944; he moved on to creating illustrations for books and magazines such as Reader's Digest and The Saturday Evening Post. He was one of the founding faculty for the Famous Artists School.

In 1969, he was elected to the Society of Illustrators' Hall of Fame.

He died from leukemia in Paris, where he had retired.

References

External links
 Tegneseriemusee Biography 
 Lambiek.net's biography
 

1973 deaths
1908 births
American cartoonists
American comics artists
American magazine illustrators